A Century of Boxing Greats: Inside the Ring with the Hundred Best Boxers is a book about boxing, written by Patrick Myler and published in England in 1997 by Robson Books. Printed in Great Britain by St. Edmundsdurry Press, in Suffolk, and released in 1998 in the United States by Robson/Parkwest Publications in New York City, the book has the Library of Congress catalog card number 97-74450. Hardcover: . Softcover: .

List of boxers covered

History of boxing
1997 non-fiction books
Boxing books